The Talvivaara mine is one of the largest nickel mines in Finland. The mine is located in Sotkamo in Kainuu region of Finland. The mine is owned by government-established Terrafame, which bought it from the bankruptcy-bound Talvivaara Mining Company in 2015. Its annual production capacity is over 10 million tonnes of ore. The mine has reserves amounting to 1 billion tonnes of ore grading 0.22% nickel, 0.13% copper, 0.5% zinc and 0.02% cobalt thus resulting 2.2 million tonnes of nickel, 1.3 million tonnes of copper, 5 million tonnes of zinc and 0.2 million tonnes of cobalt.

The mine had suffered several leaks of toxic metal-contaminated tailings, which had threatened local waterways. Members of the management were charged with criminal environmental offenses.

References

External links

Official website

Nickel mines in Finland
Zinc mines in Finland
Sotkamo